Flat Gap is an unincorporated community located in Wayne County, Tennessee. The community is just off U.S. Route 64 near the Hardin County line.

Nearby communities
Houston, Tennessee
Olivehill, Tennessee
Clifton, Tennessee
Martin's Mills, Tennessee
Lutts, Tennessee

References

Unincorporated communities in Wayne County, Tennessee
Unincorporated communities in Tennessee